Mirashi is both a given name and a surname. Notable people with the name include:

 Mirashi Buwa (1883–1966), Indian classical singer
 Vasudev Vishnu Mirashi (1893–1985), Sanskrit scholar and Indologist
 Pal Mirashi (1925–2001), Albanian footballer

See also
 Miras